The Mount Banahaw forest mouse (Apomys banahao) is a forest mouse endemic to the Mount Banahaw area in the Philippines.

References

Apomys
Rodents of the Philippines
Mammals described in 2011
Endemic fauna of the Philippines